The UMass Minutemen football statistical leaders are individual statistical leaders of the UMass Minutemen football program in various categories, including passing, rushing, receiving, total offense, defensive stats, and kicking. Within those areas, the lists identify single-game, single-season, and career leaders. The Minutemen represent the University of Massachusetts Amherst as an Independent in the NCAA.

Although UMass began competing in intercollegiate football in 1879, the school's official record book does not generally include entries from before the 1960s, as records from before this period are often incomplete and inconsistent.

These lists are dominated by more recent players for several reasons:
 Since the 1960s, seasons have increased from 10 games to 11 and then 12 games in length.
 The NCAA didn't allow freshmen to play varsity football until 1972 (with the exception of the World War II years), allowing players to have four-year careers.

These lists are updated through the end of the 2019 season.

Passing

Passing yards

Passing touchdowns

Rushing

Rushing yards

Rushing touchdowns

Receiving

Receptions

Receiving yards

Receiving touchdowns

Total offense
Total offense is the sum of passing and rushing statistics. It does not include receiving or returns.

Total offense yards

Total touchdowns

Defense

Interceptions

Tackles

Sacks

Kicking

Field goals made

Field goal percentage

References

UMass